Magistralny is an urban locality (an urban-type settlement) in Kazachinsko-Lensky District of Irkutsk Oblast, Russia. Population:

Geography
Magistralny is located by the Kirenga river. It lies on the route of the Ust-Kut - Severobaikalsk highway and the Baikal-Amur Mainline.

References

External links 

Urban-type settlements in Irkutsk Oblast